Nadia Lee Cohen (born November 15, 1992) is a British artist, photographer, and filmmaker. She works inside popular culture, citing inspiration from cinema, commercials, and consumerism, which then re-enters the mass media in the form of magazine covers, music videos and Instagram posts.

Early life
Born in 1992, Cohen was raised on an isolated farm in the English countryside with her father, mother and brother.

Career

Early work 
Lee Cohen’s parents helped her build sets in their garage for her earliest film and photographic projects while she attended the London College of Fashion, where she received the highest honors in BA and MA fashion photography. She relocated to Los Angeles in search of the Hollywood scenery that inspired her, only to find the real Hollywood Boulevard was one of trashy stores and broken dreams. This became her new source of inspiration for her project Women that would be published six years later. Her photographs and films are character-driven visions of saturated and surreal dreamscapes that capture the manifest pleasures and visceral terrors of the urban environment.

Photography and literary work
In 2020, Lee Cohen published her first book Women with IDEA; a major monograph six years in the making; the book featured 100 previously unseen portraits.

As a film director, Lee Cohen has worked with Tyler the Creator, Kali Uchis, A$AP Rocky and Katy Perry amongst others. Commercially, she has worked in fashion with campaigns for Balenciaga, Mac, Maison Margiela, Adidas, Schiaparelli, Gucci and Valentino. As a photographer, Nadia has shot iconic women including Billie Jean King, Pamela Anderson, Kim Kardashian, and Sophia Loren.

Lee Cohen's second book, Hello My Name Is waspublished by IDEA in December 2021. It saw Lee Cohen physically manifest herself into 33 characters (both female and male) imagined from 33 found name badges. Alongside each portrait is a still-life of found objects associated with each persona.

In 2021, Lee Cohen hosted the opening of The Academy Museum of Motion Pictures in Los Angeles, a night in collaboration with Vanity Fair, where she wore Daniel Roseberry’s iconic gold Schiaparelli design.

In May 2022, Lee Cohen opened her first solo art exhibition in the United States at Jeffrey Deitch gallery in Los Angeles. The gallery presented a thematic showcase of Cohen’s photographic works from her monographs (Women and HELLO, My Name Is), in addition to an immersive installation featuring video works and life-like sculptures.

Modeling and acting 
In 2019, Lee Cohen was cast as Danny Trejo’s girlfriend in the movie Black Licorice. In 2021, she was selected by Couture house of Schiaparelli to be the face of their new campaign, with Vogue magazine donning Nadia ‘The Schiaparelli muse we’re all obsessed with’.

Lee Cohen was previously featured as a model for Maison Margiela, appeared in Calvin Klein’s campaign, and walked for Rihanna’s Savage X Fenty Show. In 2021, she was the cover of C41 magazine, Rollacoaster Magazine and Numéro.

Filmography

2018 
 Tyler the Creator, Kali Uchis & Bootsy Collins - After the Storm
 GCDS ft Pamela Anderson - Sgualdrina
 Katy Perry - Cozy little Christmas

2019 
 Adult Swim - Future Beach
 Mac DeMarco & The Garden - Thy Mission
 A$AP Rocky - Babushka Boi
 Maison Margiela - My Mutiny
 Playboy - Once a playmate, always a playmate

References

External links 

 

Fine art photographers
Living people
1992 births